Pınarönü (also known as Kürdkendi) is a village in the Erzincan District, Erzincan Province, Turkey. The village is populated by Kurds and had a population of 171 in 2021. The hamlets of Gözeler, Kızıl and Remo Kom are attached to the village.

References 

Villages in Erzincan District
Kurdish settlements in Erzincan Province